Seppo Ilmari Linnainmaa (born 28 September 1945) is a Finnish mathematician and computer scientist. He was born in Pori. In 1974 he obtained the first doctorate ever awarded in computer science at the University of Helsinki. In 1976, he became Assistant Professor. From 1984 to 1985 he was Visiting Professor at the University of Maryland, USA. From 1986 to 1989 he was Chairman of the Finnish Artificial Intelligence Society. From 1989 to 2007, he was Research Professor at the VTT Technical Research Centre of Finland. He retired in 2007.

Explicit, efficient error backpropagation in arbitrary, discrete, possibly sparsely connected, neural networks-like networks was first described in a 1970 master's thesis (Linnainmaa, 1970, 1976), albeit without reference to NNs, when Linnainmaa introduced the reverse mode of automatic differentiation (AD), in order to efficiently compute the derivative of a differentiable composite function that can be represented as a graph, by recursively applying the chain rule to the building blocks of the function. Linnainmaa published it first, following Gerardi Ostrowski who had used it in the context of certain process models in chemical engineering some five years earlier, but didn't publish.

With faster computers emerging, the method has become heavily used in numerous applications. For example, backpropagation of errors in multi-layer perceptrons, a technique used in machine learning, is a special case of reverse mode AD.

Notes

External links
 

Living people
1945 births
People from Pori
Finnish mathematicians
Finnish computer scientists
University of Helsinki alumni
Academic staff of the University of Helsinki